Robert Danielsen (22 July 1905 – 13 April 1973) was a Norwegian footballer. He played in one match for the Norway national football team in 1928.

References

External links
 

1905 births
1973 deaths
Norwegian footballers
Norway international footballers
Sportspeople from Fredrikstad
Association football forwards
Kvik Halden FK players